Games of Desire (Ger. Die Lady) is a German-French drama film released in 1964 and featuring Swedish star Ingrid Thulin in the lead role.

Plot
Nadine Anderson, an elegant well-to-do woman, leads a luxurious but boring life, the wife of the Swedish ambassador to Athens. Her husband, Eliot's lack of sexual interest is responsible for Nadine's sexual frustration. The marriage is a fraud as Eliot is interested only in men, with an eye on his young secretary Martin. No longer willing to continue her deeply unsatisfying life Nadine becomes a prostitute in the dim streets of Piraeus, the port of Athens, in search of "real men" who give her that which her husband is neither able nor willing to.

She meets Nikos, a dock worker, who exemplifies her idea of a "real man". But his manipulative sister Electra, a prostitute and a striptease dancer, tries to blackmail the Ambassador's wife. Electra wants to leave her miserable existence behind and demands that Nadine hire her as a maid with a good salary. Nadine bows to this blackmail. Eliot Anderson is displeased because his secretary falls in love with Electra. Eliot immediately dismisses her.

Electra eventually learns that Nadine works as a prostitute. At this revelation, there is a violent quarrel between the siblings, as a result of which Nikos strikes Electra violently, killing her. His relationship with Nadine is over, and she leaves him.

Production
The movie was filmed mainly in Greece. The rarely shown film passed German censorship on September 25, 1964 and was premiered on October 2, 1964. The sets were designed by Max Mellin and built by Tibor Rednas. Some years after its original release, the film was reissued under the provocative title "Countess Porno of Ecstasy" (Gräfin Porno von Ekstasien).

Reception
The German-language review magazine Films called it a "three-star story that does not live up to its artistic standards and is unacceptable in its basic attitude." The Encyclopedia of international Film called it an "ambitiously designed film collage."

Cast
 Ingrid Thulin as Nadine
 Paul Hubschmid as Elliot 
 Nikos Kourkoulos as Nikos
 Claudine Auger as Electra
 Bernard Verley as Martin

References

1964 films
German drama films
French drama films
1960s French films
1960s German films